The prefix 'U' is used for Russia and all the former Soviet republics except Moldova (LU), Estonia (EE), Latvia (EV) and Lithuania (EY). Each former Soviet republic or group of them is assigned a 2-character (Ux) prefix and Russia has 10 prefixes. The only exception is the prefix UM, which, while used for Belarus airports, is also used for a single airport (UMKK) in Russia (in the Kaliningrad Oblast exclave). For this reason, there is a UM second-level section under Russia as well as the first level section UM – Belarus.

Prior to breakup of the Soviet Union, Latvian SSR and Lithuanian SSR used prefix UM, Estonian SSR used UL and Moldavian SSR used UK.

Format of entries is:
 ICAO (IATA) – airport name – airport location

U – Russia (Russian Federation)

UE (Yakutia) 
 UEEA (ADH) – Aldan Airport – Aldan
 UEEE (YKS) – Yakutsk Airport – Yakutsk
 UELL (NER) – Chulman Neryungri Airport – Chulman
 UEMM (GYG) – Magan Airport – Magan, Russia, Sakha Republic
 UENN (NYR) – Nyurba Airport – Nyurba, Sakha Republic
 UENW (VYI) – Vilyuysk Airport – Vilyuysk, Sakha Republic
 UERO (ONK) – Olenyok Airport – Olenyok, Sakha Republic
 UERP (PYJ) – Polyarny Airport – Polyarnyj (near Udachny, not Polyarny, Murmansk Oblast)
 UERR (MJZ) – Mirny Airport – Mirny
 UESG (BGN) – Belaya Gora Airport – Belaya Gora, Sakha Republic
 UESO (CKH) – Chokurdakh Airport – Chokurdakh
 UESS (CYX) – Chersky Airport – Chersky
 UEST (IKS) – Tiksi Airport – Tiksi
 UESU (ZKP) – Zyryanka Airport – Zyryanka, Verkhnekolymsky District, Sakha Republic

UH (Far East) 
 UHBB (BQS) – Ignatyevo Airport – Blagoveschensk
 UHBI (GDG) – Magdagachi Airport – Magdagachi
 UHHH (KHV) – Khabarovsk Novy Airport – Khabarovsk
 UHKK (KXK) – Komsomolsk-on-Amur Airport – Komsomolsk-on-Amur
 UHMA (DYR) – Ugolny Airport – Anadyr
 UHMD (PVS) – Provideniya Bay Airport – Provideniya
 UHMK (KPW) – Keperveyem Airport – Keperveyem, Chukotka Autonomous Okrug
 UHMM (GDX) – Sokol Airport – Magadan
 UHMO (KVM) – Markovo Airport – Markovo, Chukotka Autonomous Okrug
 UHMP (PWE) – Pevek Airport – Pevek
 UHPP (PKC) – Yelizovo Airport – Petropavlovsk-Kamchatsky
 UHPX – Nikolskoye Airport – Nikolskoye, Kamchatka Krai
 UHSH (OHH) – Okha Airport – Okha
 UHSS (UUS) – Yuzhno-Sakhalinsk Airport – Yuzhno-Sakhalinsk
 UHWW (VVO) – Vladivostok International Airport – Vladivostok

UI (Eastern Siberia) 
 UIAA (HTA) – Kadala Airport – Chita
 UIBB (BTK) – Bratsk Airport – Bratsk
 UIII (IKT) – Irkutsk International Airport – Irkutsk
 UIKE (ERG) – Erbogachen Airport – Yerbogachen
 UITT (UKX) – Ust-Kut Airport – Ust-Kut
 UIUU (UUD) – Mukhino Airport – Ulan-Ude

UL (Northwest) 
 ULAA (ARH) – Talagi Airport – Arkhangelsk
 ULAL (LDG) – Leshukonskoye Airport – Arkhangelsk
 ULAM (NNM) – Naryan-Mar Airport – Naryan-Mar
 ULDD (AMV) – Amderma Airport – Amderma
 ULKK (KSZ) – Kotlas Airport – Kotlas
 ULLI (LED) – Pulkovo Airport – Saint Petersburg
 ULMM (MMK) – Murmansk Airport – Murmansk
 ULOL (VLU) – Velikiye Luki Airport – Velikiye Luki
 ULOO (PKV) – Pskov Airport – Pskov
 ULPB (PES) – Besovets Airport – Petrozavodsk
 ULSS (RVH) – Rzhevka Airport – Saint Petersburg
 ULWW (VGD) – Vologda Airport – Vologda

UM (Kaliningrad exclave) 
Also see UM – Belarus section below, for airports in Belarus

 UMKK (KGD) – Khrabrovo Airport – Kaliningrad

UN (Western Siberia) 
 UNAA (ABA) – Abakan Airport – Abakan
 UNBB (BAX) – Barnaul Airport – Barnaul
 UNCC (in METAR reports UNNN) – Severny Airport – Novosibirsk 
 UNEE (KEJ) – Kemorovo Airport – Kemerovo
 UNIP (TGP) – Podkamennaya Tunguska Airport – Podkamennaya Tunguska, Krasnoyarsk
 UNIW – Vanavara Airport – Vanavara
 UNKL (KJA) – Krasnoyarsk Yemelyanovo Airport – Krasnoyarsk
 UNKY (KYZ) – Kyzyl Airport – Kyzyl
 UNNT (OVB) – Novosibirsk Tolmachevo Airport – Novosibirsk
 UNOO (OMS) – Tsentralny Airport – Omsk
 UNTT (TOF) – Bogashevo Airport – Tomsk
 UNWI – Tashtagol Airport – Tashtagol
 UNWW (NOZ) – Novokuznetsk Spichenkovo Airport – Novokuznetsk

UO (Central Siberia) 
 UODD (DKS) – Dikson Airport – Dikson
 UOHH (HTG) – Khatanga Airport – Khatanga
 UOOO (NSK) – Norilsk Airport – Norilsk
 UOTT (THX) – Turukhansk Airport – Turukhansk

UR (South and Caucasus) 

 URKA (AAQ) – Vityazevo Airport – Anapa
 URKH – Khanskaya Airport – Khanskaya
 URKK (KRR) – Pashkovsky Airport – Krasnodar
 URKM – Maykop Airport – Maykop
 URMG (GRV) – Grozny Airport – Grozny
 URML (MCX) – Uytash Airport – Makhachkala
 URMM (MRV) – Mineralnye Vody Airport – Mineralnye Vody
 URMN (NAL) – Nalchik Airport – Nalchik
 URMO (OGZ) – Beslan Airport – Vladikavkaz
 URMT (STW) – Shpakovskoye Airport – Stavropol
 URRP (ROV) – Platov Airport – Rostov-on-Don
 URRR (RVI) – Rostov-on-Don Airport – Rostov-on-Don
 URSS (AER) – Sochi International Airport – Sochi
 URWA (ASF) – Astrakhan Airport – Astrakhan
 URWI (ESL) – Elista Airport – Elista
 URWW (VOG) – Gumrak Airport – Volgograd

US (Urals region) 
 USCC (CEK) – Balandino Airport – Chelyabinsk
 USCM (MQF) – Magnitogorsk Airport – Magnitogorsk
 USDA (SBT) – Sabetta International Airport – Sabetta
 USDB (BVJ) – Bovanenkovo Airport – Bovanenkovo
 USDD (SLY) – Salekhard Airport – Salekhard
 USHH (HMA) – Khanty-Mansiysk Airport – Khanty-Mansi Autonomous Okrug
 USII (IJK) – Izhevsk Airport – Izhevsk
 USKK (KVX) – Kirov Airport – Kirov
 USMM (NYM) – Nadym Airport – Nadym
 USMU (NUX) – Novy Urengoy Airport – Novy Urengoy
 USNN (NJC) – Nizhnevartovsk Airport – Nizhnevartovsk
 USNR (RAT) – Raduzhny Airport – Raduzhny
 USPP (PEE) – Bolshoye Savino Airport – Perm
 USRK (KGP) – Kogalym Airport – Kogalym
 USRN (NFG) – Nefteyugansk Airport – Nefteyugansk
 USRO (NOJ) – Noyabrsk Airport – Noyabrsk
 USRR (SGC) – Surgut Airport – Surgut
 USSS (SVX) – Koltsovo International Airport – Yekaterinburg
 USTO (TOX) – Tobolsk Airport – Tobolsk
 USTR (TJM) – Roschino Airport – Tyumen
 USUU (KRO) – Kurgan Airport – Kurgan

UU (Moscow region) 
 UUBB (BKA) – Bykovo Airport – Zhukovsky / Moscow (closed)
 UUBD – Dyagilevo (air base) – Ryazan
 UUBP (BZK) – Bryansk Airport – Bryansk
 UUBS (LNX) – Smolensk North Airport – Smolensk
 UUBW (ZIA) – Zhukovsky International Airport – Zhukovsky / Moscow
 UUDD (DME) – Domodedovo International Airport – Moscow
 UUDL (IAR) – Tunoshna Airport – Yaroslavl
 UUEE (SVO) – Sheremetyevo International Airport – Moscow
 UUEI  – Kimry Airport – Kimry
 UUEM (KLD) – Migalovo Airport – Tver
 UUMB – Kubinka (air base) – Kubinka
 UUMO (OSF) – Ostafievo International Airport – Podolsk (Moscow Oblast)
 UUMU (CKL) – Chkalovsky Airport – Shchyolkovo (Moscow Oblast)
 UUOB (EGO) – Belgorod Airport – Belgorod
 UUOO (VOZ) – Chertovitskoye Airport – Voronezh
 UUWR (RZN) – Turlatovo Airport – Ryazan
 UUWW (VKO) – Vnukovo Airport – Moscow
 UUYH (UCT) – Ukhta Airport – Ukhta
 UUYP (PBX) – Pechora Airport – Pechora
 UUYW (VKT) – Vorkuta Airport – Vorkuta
 UUYY (SCW) – Syktyvkar Airport – Syktyvkar

UW (Volga region) 
 UWGG (GOJ) – Strigino Airport – Nizhny Novgorod
 UWKD (KZN) – Kazan Airport – Kazan
 UWKE (NBC) – Begishevo Airport – Nizhnekamsk
 UWKI (JOK) – Chistopol Airport – Yoshkar-Ola
 UWKS (CSY) – Cheboksary Airport – Cheboksary
 UWLL (ULV) – Ulyanovsk Baratayevka Airport – Ulyanovsk
 UWLW (ULY) – Vostochny Airport – Ulyanovsk
 UWOO (REN) – Tsentralny Airport – Orenburg
 UWOR (OSW) – Orsk Airport – Orsk
 UWPP (PEZ) – Penza Airport – Penza
 UWPS (SKX) – Saransk Airport – Saransk
 UWSS (RTW) – Tsentralny Airport – Saratov
 UWUK (OKT) – Oktyabrsky Airport – Oktyabrsky
 UWUU (UFA) – Ufa International Airport – Ufa
 UWWW (KUF) – Kurumoch Airport – Samara

UA – Kazakhstan 

 UAAA (ALA) – Almaty International Airport – Almaty
 UAAH (BXH) – Balkhash Airport – Balkhash
 UAAT (TDK) – Taldykorgan Airport – Taldykorgan
 UACC (NQZ) – Nursultan Nazarbayev International Airport – Nur-Sultan
 UACK (KOV) – Kokshetau Airport – Kokshetau (Kokchetav)
 UACP (PPK) – Petropavl Airport (Petropavlovsk Airport) – Petropavl
 UADD (DMB) – Taraz Airport – Taraz
 UAFA – Tamga Airport – Tamga
 UAII (CIT) – Shymkent International Airport – Shymkent (Chimkent)
 UAKD (DZN) – Zhezkazgan Airport – Zhezkazgan
 UAKK (KGF) – Sary-Arka Airport (Karaganda Airport) – Karaganda
 UAOL (BXY) – Baikonur Krayniy Airport – Baikonur
 UAOO (KZO) – Kyzylorda Airport – Kyzylorda
 UARR (URA) – Oral Ak Zhol Airport (Uralsk Airport) – Oral (Uralsk)
 UASB (EKB) – Ekibastuz Airport – Ekibastuz
 UASK (UKK) – Oskemen Airport (Ust-Kamenogorsk Airport) – Oskemen (Ust Kamenogorsk)
 UASP (PWQ) – Pavlodar Airport – Pavlodar
 UASS (DLX) – Semey Airport (Semipalatinsk Airport) – Semey (Semipalatinsk)
 UATE (SCO) – Aktau Airport – Aktau
 UATG (GUW) – Atyrau Airport – Atyrau
 UATT (AKX) – Aktobe Airport – Aktobe (Aktyubinsk)
 UAUR (AYK) – Arkalyk Airport – Arkalyk
 UAUU (KSN) – Kostanay Airport – Kostanay

UB – Azerbaijan 

 UBBB (GYD) – Heydar Aliyev International Airport – Baku
 UBBG (GNJ) – Ganja International Airport – Ganja
 UBBF (FZL) – Fuzuli International Airport – Fuzuli
 UBBL (LLK) – Lankaran International Airport – Lankaran
 UBBN (NAJ) – Nakhchivan International Airport – Nakhchivan
 UBBQ (GBB) – Qabala International Airport – Qabala
 UBBS – Stepanakert Airport – Stepanakert
 UBBY (ZTU) – Zaqatala International Airport – Zaqatala
 UBBZ (ZZE) – Zangilan International Airport – Zangilan

UC – Kyrgyzstan 

 UCFB – Batken Airport – Batken
 UCFE – Kerben Airport – Kerben
 UCFF – Tokmok Airport – Tokmok
 UCFG – Cholpon-Ata Airport – Cholpon-Ata
 UCFI – Isfana Airport – Isfana
 UCFJ – Jalal-Abad Airport – Jalal-Abad
 UCFL – Tamchy Airport – Tamchy
 UCFM (FRU) – Manas International Airport – Bishkek
 UCFN – Naryn Airport – Naryn
 UCFO (OSS) – Osh Airport – Osh
 UCFP – Karakol International Airport – Karakol
 UCFR – Balykchy Airport – Balykchy
 UCFS – Kyzyl-Kiya Airport – Kyzyl-Kiya
 UCFT – Talas Airport – Talas
 UCFU – Ak-Chiy Aerodrome – Bishkek
 UCFW – Kant Airport – Kant
 UCFX – Toktogul Airport – Toktogul
 UCFZ – Kazarman Airport – Kazarman

UD – Armenia 

 UDLS – Stepanavan Airport – Stepanavan
 UDSG (LWN) – Shirak Airport – Gyumri
 UDYE – Erebuni Airport – Yerevan
 UDYZ (EVN) – Zvartnots International Airport – Zvartnots (near Yerevan)

UG – Georgia 

 UGAM  - Ambrolauri Airport - Ambrolauri
 UGGT  – Telavi Aerodrome – Telavi
 UGKO (KUT) – Kopitnari Airport / David the Builder Kutaisi International Airport – Kutaisi
 UGMS  – Queen Tamar Airport – Mestia
 UGSA  – Natakhtari Airfield – Natakhtari
 UGSB (BUS) – Batumi Airport – Batumi
 UGSS (SUI) – Sukhumi Dranda Airport – Sokhumi
 UGTB (TBS) – Tbilisi International Airport – Tbilisi

UK – Ukraine 

 UKBB (KBP) – Boryspil International Airport – Boryspil (near Kyiv)
 UKBC – Bila Tserkva Airfield – Bila Tserkva
 UKBD – Kyiv-South Airfield – (near Hrebinky)
 UKBF – Konotop Air Base – Konotop
 UKBM (MXR) – Myrhorod Airport – Myrhorod
 UKCC (DOK) – Donets'k Airport – Donetsk
 UKCK (KRQ) – Kramatorsk Airport – Kramatorsk
 UKCM (MPW) – Mariupol Airport – Mariupol
 UKCS (SEV) – Sieverodonetsk Airport – Sieverodonetsk
 UKCW (VSG) – Luhansk International Airport – Luhansk
 UKDB (ERD) – Berdyansk Airport – Berdyansk
 UKDD (DNK) – Dnipropetrovs'k International Airport – Dnipro
 UKDE (OZH) – Zaporizhzhia International Airport – Zaporizhzhia
 UKDM  – Melitopol Air Base – Melitopol
 UKDP – Pidhorodne Airport – Pidhorodne
 UKDR (KWG) – Kryvyi Rih International Airport – Kryvyi Rih
 UKFB (UKS) – "Belbek" Sevastopol International Airport – Sevastopol
 UKFF (SIP) – Simferopol International Airport – Simferopol
 UKFI – Saki Air Base – Saky
 UKFK (KHC) – Kerch Airport – Kerch
 UKFV – Yevpatoria Airport – Yevpatoria
 UKFW – Zavodske Airfield – Simferopol
 UKFY – Dzhankoi Airport – Dzhankoi (since 2014 uccupied by Russia)

 UKHH (HRK) – Kharkiv International Airport – Kharkiv
 UKHK (KHU) – Kremenchuk Airport – Kremenchuk
 UKHP (PLV) – Poltava Airport – Poltava
 UKHS (UMY) – Sumy Airport – Sumy
 UKHV – Kharkiv North – Kharkiv
 UKHW – Chuhuiv Air Base – Chuhuiv

 UKKE (CKC) – Cherkasy Airport – Cherkasy
 UKKG (KGO) – Kirovohrad Airport – Kropyvnytskyi
 UKKH – Uzyn (Chepelevka) Air base – Uzyn (closed)
 UKKJ – Kyiv Chaika Airfield – Kyiv
 UKKK (IEV) – Kyiv International Airport – Kyiv
 UKKL (CEJ) – Chernihiv Shestovitsa Airport – Chernihiv
 UKKM  – Hostomel Airport – Hostomel
 UKKO – Ozerne Air Base – Zhytomyr

 UKKT (NNN) – Sviatoshyn Airfield – Kyiv
 UKKV (ZTR) – Zhytomyr Airport – Zhytomyr
 UKLA – Sambir Air Base – Kalyniv
 UKLB – Brody Air Base – Brody
 UKLC (UCK) – Lutsk Airport – Lutsk
 UKLF – Horodok Northwest Air Base – Horodok
 UKLH (HMJ) – Khmelnytskyi Airport – Khmelnytskyi
 UKLI (IFO) – Ivano-Frankivsk Airport – Ivano-Frankivs'k
 UKLL (LWO) – Lviv International Airport – Lviv
 UKLN (CWC) – Chernivtsi Airport – Chernivtsi
 UKLO – Kornych Air Base – Kolomyia
 UKLR (RWN) – Rivne Airport – Rivne
 UKLS – Starokostiantyniv (air base) – Starokostiantyniv
 UKLT (TNL) – Ternopil Airport – Ternopil
 UKLU (UDJ) – Uzhhorod Airport – Uzhhorod
 UKOG – Genichesk Air Base – Henichesk
 UKOH (KHE) – Chernobaevka Airport – Kherson
 UKOI – Izmail International Airport – Izmail
 UKOM – Lymanske Airport – Lymanske
 UKON (NLV) – Mykolaiv Airport – Mykolaiv
 UKOO (ODS) – Odesa International Airport – Odesa
 UKRN – Nizhyn Air Base – Nizhyn
 UKWW (VIN) – Vinnytsia Airport – Vinnytsia

UM – Belarus 

Also see UM section above, for an airport in Russia

 UMBB (BQT) – Brest Airport – Brest
 UMGG (GME) – Gomel Airport – Homel
 UMII (VTB) – Vostochny Airport – Vitebsk
 UMMA – Baranovichi (air base) – Baranavichy
 UMMG (GNA) – Hrodna Airport – Obukhovo
 UMMM (MHP) – Minsk-1 – Minsk
 UMMS (MSQ) – Minsk International Airport – Minsk
 UMOO (MVQ) – Mogilev Airport – Mogilev

UT – Tajikistan, Turkmenistan, Uzbekistan

Tajikistan 

 UTDD (DYU) – Dushanbe Airport – Dushanbe, Tajikistan
 UTDK – Kulob Airport – Kulyab, Tajikistan
 UTDL (LBD) – Khujand Airport – Khujand, Tajikistan
 UTDT – Bokhtar International Airport – Bokhtar, Tajikistan
 UTOD – Khorog Airport – Khorog, Tajikistan

Turkmenistan 

 UTAA (ASB) – Ashgabat Airport (Ashkhabad Airport) – Ashgabat (Ashkhabad)
 UTAK (KRW) – Turkmenbashi Airport – Turkmenbashi
 UTAM (MYP) – Mary Airport – Mary
 UTAT (TAZ) – Dashoguz Airport – Dashoguz
 UTAV (CRZ) – Turkmenabat Airport – Turkmenabat (Chardzhou)
 UTAE – Kerki Airport – Kerki (Atamyrat)

Uzbekistan 

 UTFA (AZN) – Andizhan Airport – Andizhan
 UTFN (NMA) – Namangan Airport – Namangan
 UTKF (FEG) – Fergana Airport – Fergana
 UTNN (NCU) – Nukus Airport – Nukus
 UTNT – Turtkul Airport – Turtkul
 UTNU (UGC) – Urgench Airport – Urgench
 UTSA (NVI) – Navoi International Airport – Navoi
 UTSB (BHK) – Bukhara Airport – Bukhara
 UTSK (KSQ) – Karshi Airport – Qarshi/Karshi
 UTSL (KSQ) – Karshi-Khanabad – near Qarshi/Karshi
 UTSN (AFS) – Zarafshan Airport – Zarafshan
 UTSS (SKD) – Samarkand Airport – Samarkand
 UTST (TMJ) – Termez Airport – Termez
 UTTT (TAS) – Tashkent Airport – Tashkent

References

 
 
  – includes IATA codes
 Aviation Safety Network – IATA and ICAO airport codes

U
ICAO code
Airports by ICAO code
Airports by ICAO code
Airports by ICAO code
Airports by ICAO code
Airports by ICAO code
Airports by ICAO code
Airports by ICAO code
Airports by ICAO code
Airports by ICAO code
Airports by ICAO code